General Bernardino Caballero (or simply Caballero) is a town and a district in the Paraguarí Department of Paraguay. It is named after Bernardino Caballero, President of Paraguay from 1881 until 1886.

Location

Caballero is located in the north-west region of the Paraguarí department, 101 km from Asunción, the capital of the Paraguay; and about 30 km from the city of Paraguarí.

To get there one should take the national route number 1 to Paraguarí, and there take a detour to Gral. Bernardino Caballero.

Geography

The topography of the district is characterized by hills, streams and swamps. Borders are the following:

 At North it borders with the districts of Valenzuela and San José de los Arroyos.
 At South it borders with the Acahay and La Colmena districts.
 At East it borders with Ybytimí district.
 At West it borders with Sapucaí district.

External links
Secretaria Nacional de Turismo
World Gazeteer: Paraguay – World-Gazetteer.com

Districts of Paraguarí Department